Eric Luis Rubio Barthell (born 30 June 1950) is a Mexican politician affiliated with the Institutional Revolutionary Party. As of 2014 he served as Senator of the LVIII and LIX Legislatures of the Mexican Congress representing Yucatán and as Deputy of the LIV and LVI Legislatures.

References

1950 births
Living people
Politicians from Mexico City
Members of the Senate of the Republic (Mexico)
Members of the Chamber of Deputies (Mexico)
Institutional Revolutionary Party politicians
20th-century Mexican politicians
21st-century Mexican politicians
Monterrey Institute of Technology and Higher Education alumni